The 1888–89 season was the second season of football by Celtic. They competed in the Scottish Cup, Glasgow Exhibition Cup, Glasgow Merchants Charity Cup, Glasgow Cup and Glasgow North Eastern Cup.

Results and fixtures

Pre-season and friendlies

Scottish Cup

Glasgow Cup

Glasgow Merchants Charity Cup

Glasgow North Eastern Cup

Rangers & Clydesdale Harriers Sports Cup

Notes

References

Celtic F.C. seasons
Celtic